1926 in philosophy

Events

Publications
 Jan Smuts, Holism and Evolution (1926) [Note: The term holism was coined by the author.]
 Nicolai Hartmann, Ethik (1926)
 Will Durant, The Story of Philosophy (1926)
 Sarvepalli Radhakrishnan, The Hindu View of Life (1926)

Births
 January 3 - Robert Misrahi
 January 4 - Marcus George Singer (died 2016)
 January 14 - Peter Winch, British philosopher of social science (died 1997)
 January 17 - Shizuteru Ueda, Japanese philosopher of religion
 February 1 - Leonardo Polo (died 2013)
 April 6 - Edward Grant
 April 9 - John E. Thomas (died 1996)
 April 29 - Renford Bambrough 
 June 6 - José María Valverde (died 1996)
 June 25 - Ingeborg Bachmann (died 1973)
 June 26 - Karel Kosík (died 2003)
 July 8 - David Malet Armstrong 
 July 31 - Hilary Putnam (died 2016)
 August 2 - Herbert McCabe (died 2001)
 August 7 - Arthur Chute McGill, Canadian-born American theologian and philosopher (died 1980)
 August 12 (probable) - Jamal Khwaja, Indian philosopher
 August 18 - Herbert Thomas Mandl (died 2007)
 August 21 - Erwin Marquit (died 2015)
 September 1 - Stanley Cavell (died 2018)
 September 23 - Hugo Adam Bedau 
 September 24 - Louis H. Mackey (died 2004)
 October 15 - Michel Foucault (died 1984)
 October 29 - Joel Feinberg (died 2004)
 September 4 - George Dickie
 September 4 - Ivan Illich (died 2002)
 October 9 - Hans Skjervheim
 December 13 - Truman G. Madsen (died 2009)
 December 25 - Eugene Gendlin, Austrian-born American philosopher (died 2017)
date unknown
 Abdoldjavad Falaturi, German scholar of Iranian origin (died 1996)
 William Alvin Howard
 Kai Nielsen, Canadian philosopher
 Hartley Rogers, Jr., mathematician working in recursion theory (died 2015)

Deaths
 March 7 - Carl Nicolai Starcke (born 1858)
 April 17 - Anna Willess Williams (born 1852)
 June 21 - Paul Souriau (born 1852)
 September 15 - Rudolf Christoph Eucken (born 1846)
 December 23 - Swami Shraddhanand (born 1856)

References

Philosophy
20th-century philosophy
Philosophy by year